Buckhead Village District (previous named the Streets of Buckhead and Buckhead Atlanta) is a  planned mixed-use development in the Buckhead district in Atlanta, Georgia. The project is a redevelopment of part of the Buckhead Village neighborhood bounded by Peachtree Rd., E. Paces Ferry Rd., Pharr Rd., and N. Fulton Drive. It is located just  from two of the region's most prominent and upscale malls, Lenox Square and Phipps Plaza.

History
In May 2011, San Diego-based OliverMcMillan Inc. purchased the land from Ben Carter Properties and began developing the project. The project was renamed that same month.

In September 2011, McMillan announced a further delay in the project, and that construction would not begin until the end of the first quarter of 2012. McMillan intended to invest $300 million to complete the project in which Ben Carter had already invested $400 million.

In early 2013 construction began after a hiatus of three years. As of July 2014 the project was nearing completion.

In 1838, Henry Irby had purchased  surrounding what is now Buckhead Village from Daniel Johnson for $650. Irby subsequently established a general store and tavern at the northwest corner of the Peachtree–Roswell–Paces Ferry intersection.

To reverse a downturn in the Village during the 1980s, minimum parking spot requirements for bars were lifted, which quickly led to it becoming the most dense concentration of bars and clubs in the city, such as BAR, World Bar, Lulu's Bait Shack, Mako's, Tongue & Groove, Chaos and John Harvard's Brew House. By 1996 Buckhead Village nightlife was like "Mardi Gras, complete with nightly arrests, puking in the streets and [drunk] college girls".

By the late 1990s the clientele was changing, street cruising and "hanging" was common, and crime was increasing, sometimes violent. To ameliorate the situation, the Atlanta City Council passed an ordinance to close bars at 2:30 a.m. rather than 4 a.m., and liquor licenses were made more difficult to obtain or renew. Most of the bars and nightclubs closed between 2000 and 2007.

In 2006–07, Ben Carter bought parcels in the area in order to develop the Streets of Buckhead. Demolition of existing structures began in August 2007.

Original plans by developer Ben Carter Properties, LLC called for a $1.5 billion upscale mixed-use development. The Streets of Buckhead was dubbed "Atlanta's new upscale shopping", as it was to feature  of exclusive shopping, 14 fine dining restaurants, two four-star hotels, 350 multimillion-dollar condominia and class-A office space. It aimed to be the most exclusive shopping area in the Southern United States.

Originally scheduled for a grand opening of November 2009, by April 2009, work slowdowns pushed the projected opening back to Fall 2011.

On May 2, 2011, San Diego-based OliverMcMillan Inc. purchased the land from Ben Carter Properties. Baupost Group LLC, a Boston hedge fund, is to provide $300 million of new equity.

OliverMcMillan plans to change much of the original plans: they are "not seeking a Rodeo Drive-type development" and "the level of restaurants and retail might be somewhat different". It is to be an "urban village" woven into the Buckhead Community.

Plans no longer include the two hotels. Rather than upscale restaurants, the development will target local chefs. A street grid system and street-level cafés and stores are to promote walkability.

The first retailers and restaurants opened on September 18, 2014.

Tenants
Buckhead Atlanta includes 32 retail stores and restaurants with 12 more tenants set to open by the end of 2015.

Retail
 
 Akris
 Alice + Olivia
 Bella Bag
 Billy Reid
 Bonobos
 Brunello Cucinelli
 Canali
 Christian Louboutin
 Dior
 Diptyque
 Etro
 Helmut Lang
 Hermès
Hottie+Lord
 Intermix
 Jimmy Choo
 Jonathan Adler
 L'Occitane en Provence
 La Perla
 Moncler
 Theory
 Tod's
 Tom Ford
 Vilebrequin
 Warby Parker

Food and beverage
 
 American Cut
 Doraku Sushi
 Fado Irish Pub
 Georgetown Cupcake
 Gypsy Kitchen
 Le Bilboquet
 Qing Mu
 Shake Shack
 The Southern Gentleman
 Taverna

See also
List of shopping malls in the United States
Lenox Square
Phipps Plaza
King of Prussia (mall)
Bal Harbour Shops

References

Shopping malls in the Atlanta metropolitan area
Shopping districts and streets in the United States
Buildings and structures in Atlanta
Buildings and structures under construction in the United States
Mixed-use developments in Georgia (U.S. state)